Flux is the second studio album by Caveman Shoestore, released in 1994 by Tim/Kerr.

Track listing

Personnel
Adapted from the Flux liner notes.

Caveman Shoestore
 Fred Chalenor – low-end bass guitar
 Amy DeVargas – lead vocals, high-end bass guitar
 Elaine di Falco – keyboards, backing vocals, cover art
 Henry Franzoni – drums

Production and design
 Steven Birch – design
 Nick Kellogg – engineering
 Duncan Stanbury – mastering
 Oliver Strauss – mastering
 Marc Trunz  – photography
 Jimi Zhivago – production, mastering

Release history

References

External links 
 Flux at Discogs (list of releases)

1994 albums
Caveman Shoestore albums
Tim/Kerr Records albums